Blowing from a gun is a method of execution in which the victim is typically tied to the mouth of a cannon which is then fired, resulting in death. George Carter Stent described the process as follows:

Blowing from a gun was a reported means of execution as long ago as the 16th century and was used until the 20th century. The method was used by Portuguese colonialists in the 16th and 17th centuries, from as early as 1509 across their empire from Ceylon (modern day Sri Lanka) to Mozambique to Brazil. The Mughals used the method throughout the 17th century and into the 18th, particularly against rebels.

This method of execution is most closely associated with the British colonial rule in India. Following the Indian Rebellion of 1857, "blowing from a gun" was a method the British used to execute rebels as well as for Indian sepoys who were found guilty of desertion. Using the methods previously practised by the Mughals, the British began implementing blowing from guns in the latter half of the 18th century.

Destruction of the body and scattering of the remains over a wide area had a religious function as a means of execution in the Indian subcontinent as it prevented the necessary funeral rites of Hindus and Muslims. Accordingly, for believers the punishment was extended beyond death. This was well understood by foreign occupiers and the practice was not generally employed by them as concurrent foreign occupiers of Africa, Australasia or the Americas. Most recently there was an exceptional use of the practice in Afghanistan in 1930, against 11 Panjshiri rebels.

Rituals 

A commonly reported method of blowing a person from a gun is to tie them in front of the muzzle of the gun and then have them shot. Loading the cannon with an actual cannonball is on occasion reported; but, more commonly, the use of blank cartridge or grapeshot is attested. The following description of the manner of tying up the convicted is from Afghanistan, 7 July 1839, ordered by Shuja Shah, during the campaign against Dost Mohammad Khan:

Although immobilizing a victim in front of a gun before firing the cannon is by far the most reported method, a case from Istanbul in 1596 alleges that the victim was actually put into the gun and executed in that manner. Reports exist that attest that, on occasion, people were fastened to rockets and blown into the air. This is said to have been the punishment for a Brahmin during Hyder Ali's reign (1761–1782), and also, in an 1800 treason case, in the Maratha Empire.

Problems with the method 

Things did not always work out according to plan at such executions. At a mass execution at Firozpur in 1857, there was an order that blank cartridges should be used, but some guns were loaded with grapeshot instead. Several of the spectators facing the cannons were hit by the grapeshot and some had to have limbs amputated as a result. In addition, some of the soldiers had not been withdrawn properly and sustained injuries from being hit by pieces of flesh and bone. In another case, a soldier who was to be shot managed to fall down just as the shot went off, with the following result:

Others reported how birds of prey circled above the execution place and swooped down to catch pieces of human flesh in the air, while others were nauseated by the dogs loitering about the place of execution and rushing to the scene to devour some of the body pieces spread around as a result of the execution.

Mughal Empire 

Blowing from a gun as a method of execution has a long and varied history on the Indian sub-continent, and many reports from the mid-18th century and onwards testify to its varied use. The execution method was used during rebellions and as punishment for a variety of crimes. Here, a focus is chosen upon the Mughal tradition of blowing from guns as a local tradition preceding, for example, the British tradition on the same sub-continent.

Several historians note that blowing people from the guns as a method of execution was an "old Mughal punishment" on the Indian sub-continent. Just prior to the institution of the reign of the first Mughal emperor, Babur, his son Humayun is said to have blown from guns 100 Afghan prisoners on 6 March 1526, in one incident of his father's many struggles against the Lodi dynasty. During the latter half of the 17th century, members of the Jat people in Northern India rebelled and raided against the Mughal Empire, and the emperor Aurangzeb is said in one account to have ordered one of their leaders blown from a gun. Purbeel Singh, said to have been the last Hindu chief of Umga, close to Aurangabad in today's Bihar state, was reportedly taken by an unnamed Mughal emperor to Aurungabad, and blown from a gun. The Sikh rebel Banda Singh Bahadur was finally vanquished in 1716 by the emperor Farrukhsiyar, and after his execution, Banda's son was ordered to be "blown to bits by a cannon".

While the preceding cases are examples of rebels or military adversaries being blown from guns, the Mughal era also contained a few examples of using this form of execution for other types of perceived crime. For example, in a rather anecdotal story from the times of Jahangir (r. 1605 – 1627), the emperor had six mullahs blown from guns, for having consented to, and given approval of, the forcible abduction and marriage of a Hindu girl to a Muslim officer. In 1714, thieves were a severe annoyance to a marching army; a trap was made, and two thieves caught by the concealed guards were later blown from guns. During a siege in 1719, the problem of deserters was eventually solved for the commander of the Mughal army by blowing four deserters caught in the act from guns, in the presence of his troops.

Portuguese Empire 

Portuguese colonialists are, in several accounts, charged with having used blowing from a gun as a form of capital punishment in many of their colonies. A short review follows:

Sri Lanka 

The Portuguese explorer Francisco de Almeida is reported to have blown many individuals from guns at Ceylon, around 1509. During the Dutch siege of Colombo in 1656, the city population endured extreme famine. One nursing mother became so starved that her production of milk stopped, and her infant was dying. She chose to kill it, and eat it. Once the Portuguese general became aware of her act of cannibalism, he ordered her blown from a gun, but in this particular instance, the clergy and the principal citizens dissuaded him from carrying out the act.

Mozambique 

During explorer Francisco Barreto's 1569–73 campaign in Monomotapa, he at one time imprisoned some 50 Muslim individuals, and had them "impaled, blown from mortars, torn apart on tree-trunks, axed or shot". In mid-18th-century Tete, in north-western Portuguese Mozambique, the capital punishment for slaves is said to have been to be blown from guns, and, in the first decade of the 19th century, it is reported that an inveterate raider chief was caught by the Portuguese and blown from a gun.

Brazil 

In 1618 Brazil, indigenous resistance against the Portuguese was unshaken, although a leader of them, Amaro, was taken prisoner and blown from a gun.

British India

Before 1857 
The British had a long tradition prior to the Indian Rebellion of executing sepoys found guilty of mutiny or desertion in this manner. According to one historian, the British tradition began in 1760, when the British East India Company examined the modes of capital punishment in use. In the district of the 24 Perganas, it was found that the common military mode of capital punishment was flogging to death. Regarding blowing from a gun as an old Mughal punishment, the East India Company opted for this technique, as being, relative to death by flogging, more deterrent, more public and more humane. Already in 1761, orders were given in Lakhipur "to fire off at the mouth of a cannon the leader of the thieves who was made prisoner, that others may be deterred". Technically, in cases of court-martial, it seems that until 1857 the courts were composed of Indian rather than British officers, but it is added: "although they are presided over, and generally led and ruled, by the superintending officer, whose duty, however, is merely to transcribe the evidence, and assist the native officers with advice and counsel".

In March 1764, a subedar (native officer) secretly planned to persuade the men under his command to defect to an enemy force; his plan was discovered, and he was court-martialed and blown from a gun in front of his troops. In September the same year, major Hector Munro executed 24 or 25 "ring leaders" who caused a battalion to desert (the desertion being on account of "lack of rewards", "scarcity of provisions" and problems with climate and disease). Approving of the execution, one commenter said: "no disposition to mutiny was thenceforth manifested". In 1775, Muctoom Sahib, the Commandant of the 9th Native Battalion in the Madras Army, refused orders to embark on a transport ship for Bombay. Sahib also persuaded the men under his command to refuse to embark; he was subsequently arrested and charged with exciting the men under his command to mutiny. In February 1775, Sahib was court-martialled and found guilty; the court sentenced him to be blown from a gun in the presence of the battalion. Afterwards, the men previously under his command quietly embarked for Bombay while the rank of "Commandant" was abolished in the Madras Army. In 1782, mutinies broke out in Bardhaman and Barrackpore. Three mutineers were sentenced to death by the court in Bardhaman, two of them to be blown from a gun, the last to be hanged. In the Barrackpore trials, four of the five on trial were sentenced to be blown from a gun, while the last was to receive a thousand lashes and "to be drummed out of the cantonments with a rope around his neck". During the Third Anglo-Mysore War (1789–1792), six regiments mutinied over arrears of pay and placed their officers under confinement. When order was restored, two of the most active mutineers were blown from guns. Not only mutineers were blown from guns, but also soldiers found guilty of desertion, as is shown from a few cases in 1781 and 1783.

Not only sepoys were executed by being blown from a gun. In 1798, mutiny broke out among the British soldiers in the 1st Battalion of the Madras Foot Artillery. One British soldier was condemned to be blown from a gun. This, however, seems to have been exceptional, and one historian says that the soldier Forster is the only European on record to have been blown from a gun by the British.

In 1804, during a military engagement, the troops under lieutenant Birch's command refused to quit the ground of their encampment. Colonel Burn deemed harsh measures were necessary, convened a court-martial, and two of the officers involved were blown from guns and nine others "severely flogged". With full approval of the action, the writer observes: "a measure which, there is every reason to believe, had the best effect, as the corps behaved during the subsequent siege with the greatest steadiness and propriety".

In the 1806 Vellore Mutiny, beginning with a nighttime massacre of British officers and soldiers, many sepoys were killed during the suppression, while six mutineers were sentenced to be blown from the guns. In 1812, a plot was discovered at Travancore to kill the European officers; two ring leaders were blown from the guns, and several others were hanged. In 1819, six deserters who had joined the ousted rajah of the annexed Kingdom of Nagpur were apprehended by the British and were blown from the guns on 7 February. In 1832 Bangalore, a conspiracy allegedly designed to exterminate all Europeans was discovered. Out of some 100 implicated, four were sentenced to be blown from the guns, two others to be shot.

Sometimes, although a person was condemned to death, he might hope for a pardon or a commuting of the punishment. In 1784, a regiment mutinied over lack of pay. Lieutenant General Laing suppressed the rebels and ordered twelve to be blown from guns. The last of the twelve was very lucky, however: Bound to the cannon's mouth, he had to endure three times that the fuse burnt out. He then asked Lieutenant General Laing whether he was really destined to die in this manner, and Laing chose to pardon him. In 1795 Midnapore, five sepoys were condemned in court-martial to be blown from guns on account of mutiny, three others to be hanged. Their cases were appealed, however, and their sentences were commuted to be dismissed from service instead. In Barrackpore Mutiny of 1824, occasioned by the resentment of sepoys to being shipped to the front in the First Anglo-Burmese War, four days after the bloody suppression of the mutiny, one of the leaders, Bindee Tiwarree of the 47th regiment was found hiding, disguised as a faqir. In the ensuing court-martial, he was condemned to be blown from a gun, but instead he was hung in chains, and after his death his body was placed in a gibbet for a few months. In 1836, a sepoy was found guilty of having fled before the enemy and abandoned his European officers. Rungish was condemned to be blown from a gun, but the sentence was commuted into "transportation beyond the sea".

The Great Rebellion 

This method of execution is strongly associated with its use by the British during the suppression of the Indian Rebellion of 1857. A sense of the scale and frequency of the executions made by the British during the 1857 insurrection is demonstrated in the reports of incidents given in the journal Allen's Indian Mail, for the year 1857:

As an example of official statistics, rather than a collection of newspaper reports, in an 1859 paper to the British House of Commons on the rebellion in the Peshawar Valley in the Punjab, for the period May–September 1857, 523 were recorded executed, of them 459 shot by musketry, 20 hanged (13 for desertion) and the last 44 blown from a gun. Of those 44, four were executed on charges of desertion, rather than mutiny. Official July–November statistics for the area about Agra says that of 78 who were given capital sentences, two had their sentence commuted into imprisonment, whereas 4 were blown from guns. Other official statistics, this time from Indore, state that, of 393 sepoys officially punished, 32 were executed, 21 of them by being blown from guns. Several Britons also maintained that Indian insurgents had blown British civilians from guns during the rebellion. A specific case, mentioned by several sources, concerns that of Mr. and Mrs. Birch, Mrs. Eckford and Mrs. Defontaine, all of whom were said to have been blown from guns at Fatehgarh.

The skull of an Indian sepoy, Alum Bheg, who was blown from a gun was found in a British pub and is the subject of the book, The Skull of Alum Bheg: The Life and Death of a Rebel of 1857.

After 1857 

The Rebellion of 1857 was not the last time that British colonial government used blowing from a cannon as an execution method. In 1871, for example, 65 members of the Sikh sect Kukas or Namdhari were executed by the British, by being blown from guns.

Afghanistan 

Within Afghanistan, a tradition of using blowing from a gun as capital punishment is attested from the early nineteenth century up to 1930. The practice was considered especially useful in Afghanistan, where "weak governance, rebellion, and rampant banditry all threatened the legitimacy" of the state. Some examples follow.

Durrani Dynasty 
In 1802, the forces of Mahmud Shah Durrani inflicted a crushing defeat on the Ghilzai tribes, and to discourage further aggression, he ordered one leader and his two sons blown from guns, as well as building a minaret out of Ghilzai skulls. In 1803, when Shah Shujah Durrani ousted his half-brother Mahmud from power, he revenged himself on an ally of Mahmud, Ashik, by blowing him from a gun for having captured by means of treachery Shujah's and Mahmud's half-brother Zaman Shah Durrani, who had been king of the Durrani Empire prior to having been ousted by Mahmud in 1800. Following the restoration of Shah Shujah to the throne during the First Anglo–Afghan War, further executions by cannon took place. In 1841, an Afghan man was blown from a gun for the murder of a European writer. Later that year, an Anglo–Durrani expedition commanded by General William Knott captured a rebel leader, who was executed on the orders of Shah Shujah's son.

The Iron Emir, 1880–1901 

In 1880, Abdur Rahman Khan became emir of Afghanistan, and he swiftly gained the nickname "the iron emir" for his perceived brutality and strong rule. For example, one source estimates that, during his 20 years on the throne, an average of 5,000 executions a year took place, several by blowing from guns. For example, in December 1889 alone, 24 are recorded as having been blown from guns, and many others executed in other ways.

Tajik reign of terror, 1929 
In January 1929, a new cycle of extreme violence broke out in Afghanistan when the Tajik Habibullāh Kalakāni became emir. The British official Humphreys wrote: "None was safe, houses were pillaged indiscriminately, women were ravished and a reign of terror was established unprecedented in the annals of bloody Afghan history". Political opponents were often blown from guns or executed in other ways. Habibullah's regime was toppled in October 1929, and then the Kuhestani Tajiks were persecuted. An article in The New York Times from 6 April 1930 was headlined with: "Eleven Afghans Blown from Guns at Kabul".

References

Bibliography

 
 
 
 
 
 
 
 
 
 
 
 
 
 
 
 
  - Read online, access date 2 May 2013
 
 
 
 
 
 
 
 
 
 
 
 
 
 
 
 
 
 
 
 
 
 
 
 
 
 
 
 
 
 
 
 
 
 
 
 
 
 
 
 
 
 
 
 
 
 

Execution methods
Capital punishment in the United Kingdom
Cannon
South Asian culture
Firearm techniques
History of South Asia